You FM refers to:

You FM (Germany)
You FM (Greece)
You FM (Sri Lanka)